Chukhloma is a town and the administrative center of Chukhlomsky District in Kostroma Oblast, Russia, located on Lake Chukhloma,  from the railway node Galich and  northeast of Kostroma, the administrative center of the oblast. Population:

History
It was first mentioned in chronicles in 1381, and was destroyed during the Time of Troubles. It was granted town status in 1778.

Etymology 
From a substrate Finno-Ugric language (cf. Proto-Uralic *ćukkз 'hill, peak', referring to the landscape around the town). Max Vasmer supported the theory of relationship between the name of Chukhloma and the ethnonyms like Chud or Chukhna, but it's viewed as folk etymology by Aleksandr Matveyev.

Administrative and municipal status
Within the framework of administrative divisions, Chukhloma serves as the administrative center of Chukhlomsky District. As an administrative division, it is incorporated within Chukhlomsky District as the town of district significance of Chukhloma. As a municipal division, the town of district significance of Chukhloma is incorporated within Chukhlomsky Municipal District as Chukhloma Urban Settlement.

Culture
Near the town there is a historical family estate of the Lermontov family.

References

Notes

Sources

External links
Official website of Chukhloma 
Chukhloma Business Directory 
Small Towns of Russia. Entry on Chukhloma 

Cities and towns in Kostroma Oblast
Chukhlomsky District
Chukhlomskoy Uyezd